Lieutenant-Colonel Edward William Pakenham (September 1819 – 5 November 1854) was an Irish soldier and Conservative Party politician from County Antrim. He served for two years as a Member of Parliament (MP), until his death in the Crimean War.

Early life
Pakenham was the eldest son of Emily (née Stapleton) Pakenham and Sir Hercules Robert Pakenham (1781–1850), a lieutenant-general of the British Army who served as aide-de-camp to King William IV.  From his father, he inherited Langford Lodge in County Antrim, which later became RAF Langford Lodge.

His mother was the fourth daughter of Sir Thomas Stapleton, 6th Baronet, 12th Baron le Despencer. His paternal grandfather was Edward Pakenham, 2nd Baron Longford and, the former, Hon. Catherine Rowley (a daughter of Elizabeth Rowley, 1st Viscountess Langford and Hercules Langford Rowley, MP.  His aunt, Catherine was the wife of Arthur Wellesley, 1st Duke of Wellington. His uncle Thomas Pakenham, 2nd Earl of Longford married Lady Georgiana Lygon (a daughter of William Lygon, 1st Earl Beauchamp). Another uncle, Maj.-Gen. Hon. Sir Edward Pakenham, served as MP for Longford Borough and was killed in action at the Battle of New Orleans. His uncle, Very Rev. Hon. Henry Pakenham was the Dean of St Patrick's Cathedral, and his aunt, Hon. Caroline Penelope Pakenham, married Henry Hamilton (eldest son of Sackville Hamilton).

Career
Pakenham joined the British Army, becoming an officer in the Grenadier Guards in 1838, and later rising to the rank of lieutenant-colonel.

At the 1852 general election, Pakenham was elected unopposed as one of the two MPs for Antrim.

Pakenham was killed in Inkerman, Turkey at the Battle of Inkerman during the Crimean War in 1854. His brother, Robert, at the relief of Lucknow in 1857.

References

External links 
 

1819 births
People from County Antrim
Members of the Parliament of the United Kingdom for County Antrim constituencies (1801–1922)
Irish Conservative Party MPs
UK MPs 1852–1857
British Army personnel of the Crimean War
Grenadier Guards officers
British military personnel killed in the Crimean War
Edward William
1854 deaths